Sara Forestier (born 4 October 1986) is a French actress, film director and screenwriter.

Life and career
Forestier began her film career in 2001.

She received a César Award for Most Promising Actress for her performance in Games of Love and Chance  (2003). She won the César Award for Best Actress in 2011 for her performance in  Le Nom des gens (2009).

Forestier resides in Paris.

Selected filmography

As actress

As filmmaker

Other awards 
2004: Prix Suzanne Bianchetti
2004: Best Actress for Games of Love and Chance at Mons International Festival of Love Films
2005: Shooting Stars Award
2005: Best Female Newcomer for Games of Love and Chance at Étoiles d'or

Decorations 
 Chevalier of the Order of Arts and Letters (2016)

References

External links

 
 
 Interview in FR2DAY about The Names of Love (Le Nom des gens)

1986 births
Living people
Best Actress César Award winners
French film actresses
21st-century French actresses
Cours Florent alumni
Most Promising Actress César Award winners
Chevaliers of the Ordre des Arts et des Lettres